Adrian Ionescu (born 17 May 1958) is a Romanian former football forward. In 1981, while playing for Steaua București in a match against Corvinul Hunedoara he was hit by opponent Ioan Andone in the right knee which led to an anterior cruciate ligament injury which ended his professional career at age 23. In 1985 he tried to make a comeback, playing in the second league for Mecanică Fină București and Farul Constanța, but retired after two years.

International career
Adrian Ionescu played three friendly games at international level for Romania, making his debut in a 2–1 loss against Czechoslovakia in which he scored Romania's goal.

Honours
Steaua București
Divizia A: 1977–78
Cupa României: 1978–79, runner-up 1976–77, 1979–80

References

External links
 

1958 births
Living people
Romanian footballers
Romania under-21 international footballers
Romania international footballers
Association football forwards
Liga I players
Liga II players
FC Steaua București players
FCV Farul Constanța players
Footballers from Bucharest